Stan Wawrinka was the two-time defending champion and successfully defended his title, defeating Borna Ćorić in the final, 6–3, 7–5. He did not lose a single set in the entire tournament.

Seeds
The top four seeds received a bye into the second round.

Draw

Finals

Top half

Bottom half

Qualifying

Seeds

Qualifiers

Lucky losers

Qualifying draw

First qualifier

Second qualifier

Third qualifier

Fourth qualifier

References
 Main Draw
 Qualifying Draw

Singles